Mullath Kadingi Vellodi CIE, ICS (1896–1987) was the appointed Chief Minister of Hyderabad state by the government of India after the fall of the Hyderabad state ruled by the Nizam.

A member of the Indian Civil Service, he was Textile Commissioner and ex-officio Joint Secretary in the Department of Industries and Civil Supplies during the British Raj. He was appointed a Companion of the Order of the Indian Empire (CIE) in the 1944 Birthday Honours list. He was a Senior Civil servant in the Government of India.He served as the Cabinet Secretary and Secretary of Planning Commission from 1957 to 1958.

Early life
Vellodi was the fourth son of His Highness K. C. Manavedan Raja, the titular Zamorin of Calicut.
He was educated at Presidency College, Madras. He joined the Indian Civil Service in December 1921. 
From 1921-1944 he held various junior positions. In 1944 he was appointed Textile Commissioner and ex-officio Joint Secretary in the Department of Industries and Civil Supplies until 1945.

From April–August 1947 he was acting Indian High Commissioner to London, overseeing the independence celebrations there. He returned to Delhi in 1947 to take up the post of Controller of Imports and Exports.

He was married to TM Kunhikav Kovilamma. They had two children, Kamala and Vasudevan.

Chief Minister (1950-52)
As the appointed Chief Minister of the Hyderabad State, he administered the state with the help of bureaucrats from Madras state and Bombay state.

Diplomat
From April–August 1947 he was acting Indian High Commissioner to London.
From 20 June 1958 to 6 December 1961 he was Indian ambassador to Bern.

See also
List of Chief Ministers of Andhra Pradesh
List of Cabinet Secretaries of India
List of chief ministers of Telangana

References

1896 births
People from Kerala
Indian Civil Service (British India) officers
Companions of the Order of the Indian Empire
1987 deaths
Defence Secretaries of India
High Commissioners of India to the United Kingdom
Hyderabad State politicians
Ambassadors of India to the Holy See